Marc Evan Jackson (born August 21, 1970) is an American comedian and actor. Some of his roles include Sparks Nevada in the Thrilling Adventure Hour, Kevin Cozner in Brooklyn Nine-Nine (he also hosts a podcast based on the sitcom, titled Brooklyn Nine-Nine: The Podcast), Trevor Nelsson in Parks and Recreation, Dr. Murphy in 22 Jump Street, Steve Woodward in Kong: Skull Island, Shawn in The Good Place (also hosting The Good Place: The Podcast), and Bradford Buzzard in the Disney XD series DuckTales.

Early life 
Jackson was born in 1970 in Buffalo, New York. He grew up in nearby Amherst, New York, along with his two siblings, a brother and a sister. He graduated from Amherst Central High School in 1988, and obtained a bachelor's degree from Calvin College in 1992 with a major in philosophy and minors in political science and environmental studies. While in college, he also participated in theatre productions.

During summers, Jackson worked as a deck hand on the MV Americana. After graduating from college, he spent a few years working on schooners, both in Michigan, as a deck hand on the schooner Malabar, and in Maine, as first mate on the Mercantile. He also worked as a producer and host for WGVU, a National Public Radio affiliate in Michigan, replacing Bill Freeman as the host of the Morning Show in 1997.

Career

Improv and acting
Jackson started his improv career with River City Improv, a group associated with Calvin University, after attending a rehearsal to play the piano. Jackson later joined The Second City Detroit, becoming a member of the main company in 1998. While at Second City Detroit he participated in the 1999 show "Phantom Menace to Society."

Jackson moved to Los Angeles in 2001. He taught improv at Second City Hollywood. He joined the long-form improv group called "The 313" in 2003. The 313 is named for Detroit's area code and is made up of mostly former Detroit residents, including Keegan-Michael Key, Larry Joe Campbell, Joshua Funk, Nyima Funk, Andy Cobb, Maribeth Monroe, and Jaime Moyer. The 313 continues to perform at comedy festivals around the country, including Las Vegas, San Francisco, and Detroit.

After meeting Mark Gagliardi and Ben Acker at Second City Hollywood, Jackson was invited to one of the first rehearsals of what would become the Thrilling Adventure Hour and became a member of the WorkJuice Players, playing Sparks Nevada in the regular segment "Sparks Nevada, Marshal on Mars". The show has been running as a live stage show since 2005 and has been published as a podcast since January 2011. Jackson also appeared in the film Drones, which was written by Acker and Blacker and directed by Amber Benson and Adam Busch.

Jackson is one half of a double act with comedian Carrie Clifford in which they play Sky & Nancy Collins, characters who live in Orange County and are trying stand-up for the first time because their friends find them funny. They have appeared on Last Comic Standing, on Last Call with Carson Daly, and at the Hollywood Improv.

Jackson starred in a web series in 2011 directed by Jordan Vogt-Roberts called Fox Compton. He has gone on to work with Vogt-Roberts many times, including on the film The Kings of Summer in 2013, Kong: Skull Island in 2017 and in the television series Mash Up on Comedy Central. Jackson has made guest appearances in a number of other television series, including Key & Peele, Psych, Arrested Development, Happy Endings, The Middle, 2 Broke Girls, Modern Family, Kroll Show, Hello Ladies, and Black-ish. In 2012, Jackson starred in Suit Up, a web series co-produced by DirecTV and Fox Digital Studio, as Jim Dunnigan. Suit Up was the first of Fox Digital Studio's series to be picked up for a second season.

In January 2012, Jackson stood in for Bradley Cooper to play the part of Ben in a staged reunion performance of Wet Hot American Summer at the San Francisco Comedy Festival.

Jackson has appeared as attorney Trevor Nelsson in half a dozen episodes of Michael Schur's comedy series Parks and Recreation, and was later cast as Kevin Cozner in Schur's and Dan Goor's series Brooklyn Nine-Nine. Jackson had a supporting role in the Amazon pilot The Rebels, which premiered online in 2014 but was not picked up for a full series. In February 2014, it was announced that Jackson would play the role of Jim in the Fox pilot titled Fatrick, along with Marcia Cross. The pilot was not picked-up as a series.

Jackson continued his affiliation with Schur by taking on a recurring role in his comedy The Good Place as Shawn, who is first identified as the judge of conflicts between the Good Place and the Bad Place, but is later revealed to be a supervisor of the Bad Place. Jackson hosted The Good Place: The Podcast and Brooklyn Nine-Nine: The Podcast for NBC.

Voice work
Jackson is known for his voiceover work, which includes movies like President Wolfman, radio series such as Adventures in Odyssey and web series including Funny or Die Presents: Brick Novax's Diary.

In October 2013, Jackson appeared as Marcus Vanston in a live performance of the podcast Welcome to Night Vale. This episode, titled "The Debate", was released on May 1, 2014.

Advertising
Jackson has appeared in numerous national ad campaigns, including Farmers Insurance with J.K. Simmons, Sears, Coors, Aaron's, Progressive, DirecTV and AT&T.

Filmography

Film

Television

Podcasts

Personal life 
Jackson married veterinarian Beth Hagenlocker on April 27, 2002. They live in Venice, Los Angeles, with their cats Penny, Charlie, and Snug.

Jackson is known for wearing a bow tie, both in character as Sparks Nevada as well as out of character.

Charity work
Jackson co-founded the Detroit Creativity Project, which teaches Detroit public school students improv as a vehicle for improving their communication skills, along with Hagenlocker, Key, Margaret Edwartowski, and Larry Joe Campbell. The Project, which was inspired by a statement by Detroit mayor Dave Bing, was founded after a series of cookouts held at Jackson and Hagenlocker's home with other actors, writers, and directors who had connections to the city. In 2015 the program will expand to teach 500 students in 19 different schools.

Jackson and Hagenlocker are also supporters of the non-profit 826LA and Jackson frequently participates in events for the organization.

References

External links 

 
 
 Marc Evan Jackson on Myspace
 Detroit Creativity Project
 Suit Up on Yahoo! Screen

Living people
Male actors from Buffalo, New York
1970 births
Calvin University alumni
American male film actors
American male television actors
American male comedians
American male voice actors
20th-century American male actors
21st-century American male actors
People from Amherst, New York
Comedians from New York (state)
20th-century American comedians
21st-century American comedians
Amherst Central High School Alumni
American podcasters